Corymbia bloxsomei, commonly known as yellowjack, yellow jacket or yellow bloodwood, is a species of tree that is endemic to inland, south-eastern Queensland. It has thick, rough scaly bark on the trunk and larger branches, lance-shaped or curved adult leaves, flower buds in groups of seven, nine or eleven, creamy white to pale yellow flowers and barrel-shaped, urn-shaped or spherical fruit.

Description
It has soft, rough, scaly or tessellated yellowish to brownish bark on the trunk and almost to the smaller branches. Flowering has been recorded in June and December and the flowers are creamy white to pale yellow.

Taxonomy and naming
Yellowjacket was first formally described in 1925 by Joseph Maiden in the Journal and Proceedings of the Royal Society of New South Wales and given the name Eucalyptus bloxsomei. In 1995, Ken Hill and Lawrie Johnson changed the name to Corymbia bloxsomei. The specific epithet (bloxsomei) honours "Herbert Schreiber Bloxsome".

Distribution and habitat
Corymbia bloxsomei grows in forest on flat or sloping areas from near Mundubbera to Chinchilla, especially in the Barakula State Forest.

Conservation status
This eucalypt is classified as of "least concern" under the Government of Queensland Nature Conservation Act 1992.

See also
 List of Corymbia species

References

bloxsomei
Myrtales of Australia
Flora of Queensland
Plants described in 1925